The Battle of Maison Carrèe was a battle between the French Foreign Legion and Algerian natives of the El Ouiffa tribe.

Battles involving France
Battles involving the French Foreign Legion
April 1832 events